James Baxter may refer to:

 James K. Baxter (1926–1972), New Zealand poet
 James Phinney Baxter (1831–1921), mayor of Portland, ME and Maine historian
 James Phinney Baxter III (1893–1975), American historian
 James Baxter (actor) (born 1990), British actor
 James Baxter (sailor), New Zealand sailor and world champion
 James Baxter (animator) (born 1967), British animator
 James Baxter (sportsman) (1870–1940), English rugby union internationalist and Olympic silver medallist
 James Clement Baxter (1857–1928), English politician and football club chairman
 James Baxter (American football) (1892–1961), American football player and coach
 James M. Baxter (1845–1909), first African-American principal of a school in Newark, New Jersey
 James Reid Baxter (1865–1908), New Zealand murderer
 Jim Baxter (1939–2001), Scottish international footballer (Rangers, Sunderland, Nottingham Forest)
 Jim Baxter (Australian footballer) (1887–1952), Australian rules footballer
 Jimmy Baxter (basketball) (born 1980), American-Jordanian basketball player
 Jimmy Baxter (footballer, born 1904) (1904–?), Scottish footballer for Leicester City, Reading, Torquay United and Boston United
 Jimmy Baxter (footballer, born 1925) (1925–1994), footballer for Dunfermline Athletic, Barnsley, Preston North End and Morecambe
 Jimmy Baxter, character in Amateur Crook
 Jimmy Baxter, a character in the television series Your Honor

See also
 James Baxter House, Amberley Village, Ohio, registered historic building
 J. B. Long (James Baxter Long, 1903–1975), businessman working mainly in the music industry